The World Championship Wrestling (WCW) Women's Cruiserweight Championship was a singles women's professional wrestling championship in World Championship Wrestling for smaller women. It was created as a joint venture between WCW and GAEA Japan. The weight limit for the women's cruiserweight division was 130 lb (as announced on WCW television).  The first champion was crowned in a four-woman tournament that began on an episode of WCW Monday Nitro on March 31, 1997 and concluded on April 7, 1997.  Since the tournament final was only shown on WCW Main Event, and the results were never mentioned on WCW television again, it is speculated that the title was created solely to be used by the GAEA promotion in Japan. In fact, the title was defended and changed hands twice in Japan before being abandoned in early 1998.

Inaugural championship tournament

Reigns

See also 
WCW Women's Championship
WCW Cruiserweight Championship
WCW Cruiserweight Tag Team Championship

References

Women's Cruiserweight Championship
Women's professional wrestling championships
Cruiserweight wrestling championships
Gaea Japan championships